Dmitri Vladimirovich Pinin (born 6 September 1975) is a Russian professional football coach and a former player.

External links
 
 

1975 births
People from Lyudinovsky District
Living people
Russian footballers
Association football forwards
FC Torpedo Minsk players
FC Znamya Truda Orekhovo-Zuyevo players
FC Dynamo Vologda players
Belarusian Premier League players
Russian expatriate footballers
Expatriate footballers in Belarus
Sportspeople from Kaluga Oblast